Leslie Creek may refer to:

Leslie Creek (Manitoba), a stream in Canada
Leslie Creek (Nine Partners Creek), a stream in the U.S. state of Pennsylvania